Port Clinton is a city in and the county seat of Ottawa County, located at the mouth of the Portage River on Lake Erie, about 44 miles east of Toledo. The population was 6,025 at the 2020 census.

The city has been nicknamed the "Walleye Capital of the World", due to the productive fishing waters for the species lying offshore in Lake Erie's Western Basin. The annual Walleye Drop on New Year's Eve in downtown Port Clinton reflects this nickname.

History 

Residents established the community in 1828 on the shores of the Portage River and Lake Erie. They named the town after DeWitt Clinton, a governor of New York who was instrumental in creating the Erie Canal, which connected the Midwest along the Great Lakes to the markets of the Hudson River and New York. Port Clinton grew slowly. In 1846, there were only sixty households in the community. Although the town had an excellent harbor and access to the Portage River, little shipping took place.

The town remained relatively small throughout the nineteenth century, with a population of 1,600 in 1880 and 2,049 residents in 1890. By 1886, Port Clinton contained three newspaper offices, four churches, and one bank. Several manufacturing businesses existed in the town, with the largest being A. Couche & Company, a sawmill that employed ten workers. Most businesses provided services or products to farmers in the surrounding countryside.

During the twentieth century, Port Clinton's population grew. In 2000, 6,391 residents lived in the community. As a whole, Ottawa County had a 2.4 percent increase in population between 1990 and 2000. Many of these new residents had left nearby Toledo, hoping to find a quieter lifestyle in Ottawa County. Numerous Port Clinton residents work in the tourism industry, operating restaurants, owning antique stores, or providing tourists with lodging in various inns and bed and breakfasts.

Geography 

Port Clinton is located at  (41.509857, -82.940156).

Demographics 

As of 2000 the median income for a household in the city was $35,564, and the median income for a family was $44,579. Males had a median income of $38,949 versus $21,651 for females. The per capita income for the city was $19,177. About 7.7% of families and 9.7% of the population were below the poverty line, including 11.2% of those under age 18 and 6.2% of those age 65 or over.

2010 census
As of the census of 2010, there were 6,056 people, 2,633 households, and 1,614 families residing in the city. The racial makeup of the city was 93.3% White, 2.3% African American, 0.1% Native American, 0.2% Asian, 1.8% from other races, and 2.1% from two or more races. Hispanic or Latino of any race were 7.8% of the population.

There were 2,633 households, of which 27.9% had children under the age of 18 living with them, 42.2% were married couples living together, 13.9% had a female householder with no husband present, 5.2% had a male householder with no wife present, and 38.7% were non-families. 33.6% of all households were made up of individuals, and 12.8% had someone living alone who was 65 years of age or older. The average household size was 2.24 and the average family size was 2.81.

The median age in the city was 41.5 years. 22.1% of residents were under the age of 18; 7.8% were between the ages of 18 and 24; 24% were from 25 to 44; 28.5% were from 45 to 64; and 17.6% were 65 years of age or older. The gender makeup of the city was 47.8% male and 52.2% female.

Economy
Port Clinton's economy benefits from its lakefront situation, with its fishing, boating, and recreational tourism industries providing employment opportunities to many locals. Port Clinton and surrounding attractions in Ottawa and Erie County are collectively known to visitors as "Vacationland", or more recently, Lake Erie's "Shores and Islands". The regional tourist economy is anchored by attractions like Cedar Point, Put-in-Bay, and Kelleys Island. Several hotels are located within the city, which provide lodging for visitors to these and other attractions. Port Clinton is the primary mainland port of the Jet Express, a passenger ferry service to Put-in-Bay. The National Rifle Matches, held at nearby Camp Perry, and the springtime bird migration at Ottawa National Wildlife Refuge, are two prominent events held annually that contribute to Port Clinton's tourist economy.

Education
Port Clinton is served by the Port Clinton City School District. It operates two elementary schools (Bataan Memorial Elementary), one middle school (Port Clinton Middle), and one high school (Port Clinton High). In 2012, Port Clinton City School District opened a new middle school and an expansion to Bataan Memorial.

Port Clinton is served by Ida Rupp Public Library, which also operates satellite locations in Marblehead and Put-in-Bay.

Media
Port Clinton is part of the Sandusky/Lake Erie Islands radio market and is included as part of the Toledo TV market.

Port Clinton is home to WPCR - PortClintonRadio.com, "Ottawa County's News, Sports, and Weather Authority."  This internet exclusive radio station carries live local sporting events, weather, and fishing reports as well as locally produced programs.

Port Clinton is served in print by the Port Clinton News Herald, the city's only daily newspaper. It is also covered by the Sandusky Register, which is the region's largest newspaper.

Notable people
Robert Putnam, political scientist, author, and Malkin Professor of Public Policy at the Harvard University John F. Kennedy School of Government, Putnam grew up in Port Clinton. He uses the city as a template in his book Our Kids: The American Dream in Crisis to examine changes in the American economic and social landscape.
 Chris Redfern, politician, former chairman of the Ohio Democratic Party, and former member of the Ohio House and its Minority Leader.
 Henry Semon, Oregon state legislator
 Louis C. Shepard, American Civil War Medal of Honor recipient from Ashtabula County, buried in Lakeview Cemetery, Port Clinton, Ottawa County, Ohio.

References

External links

 City website

Cities in Ottawa County, Ohio
County seats in Ohio
Ohio populated places on Lake Erie
Cities in Ohio